Jesita Putri Miantoro (born 1 May 2002) is an Indonesian badminton player affiliated with Exist Badminton Club. She was invited to be part of Indonesia's national badminton team in 2020. She was part of the Indonesian women's winning team at the 2022 Asia Team Championships.

Career 
In February 2020, Miantoro advanced to the finals of the Italian Junior International in girls' doubles events, but the tournament was canceled due to the outbreak of COVID-19 in Italy. She then took part at the Dutch Junior International, and won the girls' doubles event with Lanny Tria Mayasari.

2021 
In October, Miantoro and her partner Febby Valencia Dwijayanti Gani won the Czech Open.

2022 
She was selected to join the national team participated in the 2022 Asia Team Championships and Uber Cup, and the team won the Asia title after beating South Korea in the final. In the Uber Cup, the team was stopped in the quarter-finals to China. Miantoro and Mayasari then reached the finals in the senior tournament, Bonn International, and had to finished the tournament as runner-up. In July, they lost in the first round of the Singapore Open from 5th seed Chinese pair Zhang Shuxian and Zheng Yu.

In October, Miantoro was paired with Febi Setianingrum and lost in the semi-finals of Indonesia Masters Super 100 from 5th seed Japanese pair Rena Miyaura and Ayako Sakuramoto.

2023 
Miantoro and her partner Febi Setianingrum opened the 2023 season at Iran Fajr International. They won the title defeating Malaysian pair Go Pei Kee and Teoh Mei Xing.

Achievements

BWF International Challenge/Series (1 title, 2 runners-up) 
Women's' doubles

  BWF International Challenge tournament
  BWF International Series tournament
  BWF Future Series tournament

BWF Junior International (1 title) 

Girls' doubles

  BWF Junior International Grand Prix tournament
  BWF Junior International Challenge tournament
  BWF Junior International Series tournament
  BWF Junior Future Series tournament

Performance timeline

National team 
 Senior level

Individual competitions

Senior level

Women's doubles

References 

2002 births
Living people
People from Depok
Sportspeople from West Java
Indonesian female badminton players